Fitri may refer to:

 Fitri Department, Chad
 Lake Fitri, Chad